West Baden Springs is a town in French Lick Township, Orange County, in the U.S. state of Indiana. The population was 574 at the 2010 census. It is well known for its West Baden Springs Hotel and for being the birthplace of Larry Bird.

History
West Baden Springs is located in the vicinity of several mineral springs. The town was founded in the 1850s, and named after the spa towns of Wiesbaden or Baden-Baden, in Germany. A post office has been in operation at West Baden Springs since 1861.

Dixie Garage, First Baptist Church, Homestead Hotel, Oxford Hotel, West Baden National Bank, and West Baden Springs Hotel are listed on the National Register of Historic Places.

Geography
West Baden Springs is located at  (38.567018, −86.611601).

Demographics

2018 census 
As of the census in 2018, the town of West Baden Springs resided 475 people. As of right now, the results of the number of the town's households and families have not been released. The median age of West Baden Springs was 47.5 years of age. The median household income of the small town was $41,458. Between 2017 and 2018 the town's population shrunk from 526 to 475: a -9.7% decrease. The five most represented ethnic groups in West Baden Springs were as follows in descending order: White (90.3%), Black or African American (3.16%), Hispanic (1.89%), and American Indian and Alaska Native (1.47%). The average property value of West Baden is $91,600. The homeownership rate is 67.6%. The majority of West Baden Springs residents commute by driving alone and the average commute time is 17.9 minutes. The average number of cars per household in West Baden Springs is two cars.

2010 census
As of the census of 2010, there were 574 people, 251 households, and 149 families residing in the town. The racial makeup of the town was 93.4% White, 3.1% African American, 0.5% Native American, 0.3% Asian, 0.7% from other races, and 1.9% from two or more races. Hispanic or Latino of any race were 1.4% of the population.

There were 251 households, of which 27.9% had children under the age of 18 living with them, 40.2% were married couples living together, 12.7% had a female householder with no husband present, 6.4% had a male householder with no wife present, and 40.6% were non-families. 36.7% of all households were made up of individuals, and 16.8% had someone living alone who was 65 years of age or older. The average household size was 2.29 and the average family size was 2.94.

The median age in the town was 40.4 years. 24% of residents were under the age of 18; 6.6% were between the ages of 18 and 24; 26.3% were from 25 to 44; 25.3% were from 45 to 64; and 17.8% were 65 years of age or older. The gender makeup of the town was 50.2% male and 49.8% female.

2000 census
As of the census of 2000, there were 618 people, 263 households, and 175 families residing in the town. The racial makeup of the town was 94.50% White, 2.10% African American, 0.81% Native American, 0.81% Asian, 1.13% from other races, and 0.65% from two or more races. Hispanic or Latino of any race were 3.07% of the population.

There were 263 households, out of which 24.7% had children under the age of 18 living with them, 50.2% were married couples living together, 10.6% had a female householder with no husband present, and 33.1% were non-families. 29.3% of all households were made up of individuals, and 16.0% had someone living alone who was 65 years of age or older. The average household size was 2.35 and the average family size was 2.88.

In the town, the population was spread out, with 21.7% under the age of 18, 8.3% from 18 to 24, 27.7% from 25 to 44, 26.5% from 45 to 64, and 15.9% who were 65 years of age or older. The median age was 40 years. For every 100 females, there were 93.1 males. For every 100 females age 18 and over, there were 92.1 males.

The median income for a household in the town was $32,750, and the median income for a family was $40,357. Males had a median income of $29,444 versus $19,375 for females. The per capita income for the town was $14,532. About 10.3% of families and 9.7% of the population were below the poverty line, including 6.8% of those under age 18 and 13.5% of those age 65 or over.

West Baden Springs Hotel

The historic, 243-room luxury hotel is part of the French Lick Resort Casino complex that also includes the French Lick Springs Hotel and its adjacent casino. A gala event on June 23, 2007, celebrated the reopening of the restored West Baden Springs Hotel. (The renovated French Lick Springs hotel and new casino opened on November 3, 2006.)

Built in 1902, the West Baden Springs Hotel became known for the  dome covering its atrium. The hotel was listed on the National Register of Historic Places in 1974, and became a National Historic Landmark in 1987. It is also designated as a  Historic Civil Engineering Landmark.

References

External links

West Baden Springs Hotel

Towns in Orange County, Indiana
Spa towns in the United States
Springs of Indiana
Towns in Indiana
Bodies of water of Orange County, Indiana